Jawani Zindabad is an Indian romance film directed by Arun Bhatt. This film was released in 1990, starring by Aamir Khan and Farha Naaz. It was released on 17 August 1990.

Plot 
Shashi Sharma, Akbar and a group of young people pledge never to give nor receive dowry in protest against dowry system. Shashi had an elder sister who lost her life being a victim of dowry system. Acting against his mother's wishes, Shashi marries Sugandha Srivastav without asking for any dowry. He arranges his other sister, Rama's marriage with Ravi Verma, the son of Goverdhan and Shakuntala.

Goverdhan is an MLA and is a very greedy man. As he does not get any dowry, he and his wife become quite upset, though Ravi is happy. Both want Ravi to remarry, so that they can get dowry. Meanwhile, Rama becomes pregnant and so the in-laws try to eliminate her at the earliest. Goverdhan gets Ravi transferred to Delhi. After sending him away, Goverdhan plans to kill Rama in a fashion similar to an accident. But things did not turn up as he expected and his wife gets badly burned, who has to be hospitalized. Taking this opportunity, Goverdhan blames Rama for attempting to kill Shakuntala, and has her arrested. He also hires goons to kill Shashi. Shashi along with Ravi overcomes all obstacles after a fight with the goons and reaches the hospital with Ravi being seriously injured. Goverdhan becomes remorseful after seeing his injured son and asks for Rama's forgiveness. Rama who has just given birth to a daughter, forgives him. Goverdhan too pledges that no one would take nor receive any dowry henceforth in his family.

Cast

Soundtrack

References

External links 
 

1990 films
1990s Hindi-language films
1990s Urdu-language films
Urdu-language Indian films
Films scored by Anand–Milind
Hindi remakes of Kannada films